Anthology is a compilation album from Quarashi.

Detail 
Quarashi has stated that this was their last album. They did three concerts in Iceland, the summer of 2011. The first one were at Besta Útihátiðin 2011 at Gaddstaðaflötum, Hella. And the other two were at NASA, a nightclub downtown Reykjavík.

Quarashi albums
2011 compilation albums